Alessandra Comini (born November 24, 1934) is an American art historian and curator. She is University Distinguished Professor of Art History Emerita at Southern Methodist University in University Park, Texas. Proficient in music and languages as well as art history, Comini brought an interdisciplinary approach to her study of the arts in Austria and Germany at the turn of the 20th century, an approach particularly suited to the integrated art forms of fin-de-siècle Vienna.

Early and personal life
Alessandra Comini was born the daughter of Megan Laird and Raiberto Comini in Winona, Minnesota. Her earliest years were spent in Barcelona, Milan, and Dallas. Comini received her B.A. from Barnard College (1956), her M.A, from the University of California, Berkeley (1964), and her Ph.D. from Columbia University (1969). Her dissertation, written under Theodore Reff, on the topic of Egon Schiele's portraiture.

In 1974 she started working with art historian Eleanor Tufts at Southern Methodist University.

Career
While teaching at Columbia between 1965 and 1974, Comini became one of the founders of the Women's Caucus for Art in 1972.

She taught at Southern Methodist University from 1974 until 2005. And she guest taught at the University of California, Berkeley (1967) and Yale University (1973). Voted outstanding professor sixteen times by her students, Comini served as the Alfred Hodder Resident Humanist at Princeton University (1972–1973) and was named Distinguished Visiting Lecturer at Oxford University's European Humanities Research Centre (1996).

Celebrated for her witty, erudite, and compelling public lectures, Comini has been in demand as a guest speaker nationally and internationally.  As an interdisciplinary speaker, Comini lectured repeatedly at the Leipzig Gewandhaus symposia, The Santa Fe Opera, and for the Indianapolis and Dallas Symphony Orchestras.

In 1990 Comini was awarded the Grand Decoration of Honour for Services to the Republic of Austria in recognition of her contributions to Germanic culture.

In 2014 Comini turned to fiction writing and has published nine art history murder mystery novels since in the Megan Crespi Series.

The Neue Galerie Museum for German and Austrian Art, New York, commissioned Comini to curate its blockbuster exhibition Egon Schiele's Portraits (2014–15).

Honors and awards
Comini's book Egon Schiele’s Portraits (1974) was nominated for a National Book Award (1975) and received the College Art Association's Charles Rufus Morey Book Award (1976). Comini's book The Changing Image of Beethoven: A Study in Mythmaking (1987) was a pioneer application of reception history to imagery.
  1995 – Women's Caucus for Art, Lifetime Achievement Award
  1996 – United Methodist Church Scholar/Teacher of the Year Award
  2002 – Texas Hall of Fame nomination
  2005 – Comini Lecture Series established, Southern Methodist University
  2010 – Medal of Honor, Veteran Feminists of America
  2011 – Distinguished Alumna Award, Barnard College
  2012 – International Symposium, Neulengbach, Austria, "Alessandra Comini und Neulengbach"
  2018 – Golden Honor of Merit for Services to the State of Lower Austria 
  2019 – Alessandra Comini International Fellowship for Study Abroad, founded by Meadows School of the Arts, Southern Methodist University

Selected publications

In a statistical overview derived from writings by and about Alessandra Comini, OCLC/WorldCat OCLC/WorldCat (retrieved June 21, 2016) encompasses about 200 works.

  Schiele in Prison, Greenwich, New York Graphic Society, 1973. 
  Egon Schiele's Portraits, Berkeley, University of California Press, 1974, 1990.  (new edition, 2014, Santa Fe, Sunstone Press )
  Gustav Klimt, New York, George Braziller, 1975 (French, German, and Dutch editions; reissued 1986, 1990, 1994, 2001) 
  Egon Schiele, New York, George Braziller, 1976 (Italian, French, German, and Dutch editions; reissued 1986, 1994, 2001) 
  The Fantastic Art of Vienna, New York, Alfred A. Knopf, 1978.  (new edition 2016, Santa Fe, Sunstone Press )
  "The Visual Brahms: Idols and Images," Arts Magazine, 1979
  "The Age of Goethe Today: Of Plum Trees, Painters, Pianists, and Pamphleteers," Arts Magazine, 1988
  The Changing Image of Beethoven: A Study in Mythmaking, New York, Rizzoli, 1987, new edition 2008, Santa Fe, Sunstone Press 
  "Gender or Genius?  The Women Artists of German Expressionism," Feminism and Art History: Questioning the Litany, Norma Broude and Mary D. Garrard, eds., New York, Harper & Row, 1982.   
  "Nordic Luminism and the Scandinavian Response to Impressionism," World Impressionism, Norma Broude, ed., New York, H. N. Abrams, 1990. 
  "Siegesallee und Salome," Kunst und Politik in den entscheidenden Jahren von Richard Strauss, Leipzig, Gewandhaus, 1991
  "Kollwitz in Context: The Formative Years," Käthe Kollwitz, Elizabeth Prelinger, ed., New Haven, Yale University Press, 1992. 
  "Violetta And Her Sisters," Violetta And Her Sisters: The Lady of the Camellias, Responses to the Myth, Nicholas John, ed., London, Faber and Faber, 1994. 
  "Toys in Freud’s Attic," Picturing Children: Construction of Childhood between Rousseau and Freud, Marilyn Brown, ed., Burlington, VT, Ashgate, 2002. 
  In Passionate Pursuit—A Memoir, New York, George Braziller, Inc., 2004.  (new edition 2016, Santa Fe, Sunstone Press )
  Egon Schiele: Portraits, Alessandra Comini ed., "Egon Schiele: Redefining Portraiture in the Age of Angst," Munich, Prestel, 2014. 
  "The Two Gustavs: Klimt, Mahler, and Vienna’s Golden Decade, 1887–1907," Naturlauf: Scholarly Journals toward Gustav Mahler, Essays in Honour of Henry-Louis de La Grange for His 90th Birthday, Paul-André, ed., New York, Peter Lang Publishing Inc., 2015.

Megan Crespi series 
  Killing for Klimt, Santa Fe, Sunstone Press, 2014.  
  The Schiele Slaughters, Santa Fe, Sunstone Press, 2015.  
  The Kokoschka Capers, Santa Fe, Sunstone Press, 2015.  
  The Munch Murders, Santa Fe, Sunstone Press, 2016.   
  The Kollwitz Calamities, Santa Fe, Sunstone Press, 2016. 
  The Kandinsky Conundrum, Santa Fe, Sunstone Press, 2018. 
  The Mahler Mayhem, Santa Fe, Sunstone Press, 2019. The Beethoven Boomerang,  Santa Fe, Sunstone Press, 2020. 
  The Beethoven Boomerang,  Santa Fe, Sunstone Press, 2020.

See also 
 Women in the art history field

References

External links
  
  Megan Crespi Series, murder mysteries by Alessandra Comini

1934 births
American art historians
Women art historians
People from Winona, Minnesota
University of California, Berkeley alumni
Barnard College alumni
American women historians
Living people
Columbia University alumni
Feminist historians
21st-century American women
American women curators
American curators